Fabrizio Brignani (born 12 January 1998) is an Italian professional footballer who plays as a defender for  club Olbia.

Club career

Bologna 
Born in Asola, Brignani was a youth exponent of Bologna.

Loan to Pisa 
On 6 August 2019, Brignani was signed by Serie C side Pisa on a season-long loan deal. On 12 August he made his competitive debut for Pisa in a 1–0 away win against Parma in the third round of Coppa Italia. On 7 October he made his professional debut in Serie C for the club in a 0–0 home draw against Alessandria, he played the entire match. On 30 December he was sent-off with a double yellow card in the 87th minute of a 0–0 away draw against Cuneo. On 16 March 2019, Brignani scored his first professional goal in the 39th minute of a 1–0 away win over Olbia. Brignani ended his loan to Pisa with 24 appearances and 1 goal.

Loan to Cesena 
On 12 July 2019, Brignani was loaned to newly promoted Serie C club Cesena on a season-long loan deal. Six weeks later, on 25 August, Brignani made his league debut for Cesena in a 4–1 away defeat against Carpi, he was replaced by Luca Ricci in the 46th minute. One week later, on 2 September, he played his first entire match for the club, a 2–1 home defeat against Vis Pesaro. He became Cesena's first-choice early in the season. Brignani ended his season-long loan to Cesena with 19 appearances, including 15 as a starter, remaining an unused substitute for 11 other matches.

Loan to Vis Pesaro 
On 7 September 2020, Brignani was signed by Serie C club Vis Pesaro on season-long loan. Three weeks later, on 26 September, he made his debut for the club in a 2–2 home draw against Legnago Salus. He became Vis Pesaro's first-choice early in the season. Brignani ended his season-long loan to Vis Pesaro with 31 appearances, including 21 of them as a starter, remaining an unused substitute only 7 times in the entire championship.

Olbia
On 21 August 2021, he moved to Olbia on a permanent basis and signed a two-year contract.

Career statistics

Club

References

External links
 

1998 births
Living people
People from Asola, Lombardy
Sportspeople from the Province of Mantua
Footballers from Lombardy
Italian footballers
Association football defenders
Serie C players
U.S. Cremonese players
Bologna F.C. 1909 players
Pisa S.C. players
Cesena F.C. players
Vis Pesaro dal 1898 players
Olbia Calcio 1905 players